The Japanese destroyer {{nihongo|Mutsuki|睦月|"January"}} was the name ship of her class of twelve destroyers built for the Imperial Japanese Navy (IJN) during the 1920s. During the Pacific War, she participated in the Battle of Wake Island in December 1941 and the occupations of New Guinea and the Solomon Islands in early 1942. Mutsuki was one of the escorts for the invasion force during the Battle of the Coral Sea in May and then participated in the Guadalcanal Campaign later that year. The ship was sunk by American bombers during the Battle of the Eastern Solomons in August.

Design and description
The Mutsuki class was an improved version of the s and was the first with triple  torpedo tubes. They were powered by two Parsons geared steam turbines, each driving one propeller shaft, using steam provided by four Kampon water-tube boilers. Their crew consisted of 150 officers and crewmen.

The main armament of the Mutsuki-class ships consisted of four  Type 3 guns in single mounts; one gun forward of the superstructure, one between the two funnels and the last pair back to back atop the aft superstructure. The guns were numbered '1' to '4' from front to rear. The ships carried two above-water triple sets of 61-centimeter torpedo tubes; one mount was between the forward superstructure and the forward gun and the other was between the aft funnel and aft superstructure. Four reload torpedoes were provided for the tubes. They carried 18 depth charges and could also carry 16 mines. They could also fitted with minesweeping gear.

Construction and career
Mutsuki, built at the Sasebo Naval Arsenal, was laid down on 21 May 1924, launched on 23 July 1925 and completed on 26 March 1926. Originally commissioned simply as Destroyer No. 19, she was assigned the name Mutsuki on 1 August 1928. In the late 1930s, Mutsuki participated in combat in China, including the First Shanghai Incident of 1932 and other actions in the Second Sino-Japanese War.

Pacific War
At the time of the attack on Pearl Harbor on 7 December 1941, Mutsuki was the flagship of Destroyer Division 30 under Destroyer Squadron 6 of the 4th Fleet. She sortied from Kwajalein on 8 December as part of the Wake Island invasion force, carrying an advance landing party of the Japanese Special Naval Landing Forces (SNLF). After taking heavy losses (including Kisaragi and Hayate), the Japanese force withdrew before landing. This was the first Japanese defeat of the war, and also the only occasion in World War II when an amphibious assault was repulsed by shore-based guns. Mutsuki returned on 23 December with the second Wake Island invasion force, and again carried a SNLF advance landing party before returning to Kwajalein.

The ship escorted a convoy from Kwajalein to the naval base at Truk in January 1942, where a sponson was installed for a pair of license-built  Type 93 anti-aircraft machineguns on the forward side of the bridge. Mutsuki then escorted a troop convoy from Truk to Guam later that month, and then joined the invasion of the Solomon Islands, covering the landings of Japanese forces during Operation R (the invasion of Rabaul, New Ireland and New Britain), and during Operation SR (the invasion of Lae and Salamaua on New Guinea) in January–March. From 28 March to 1 April, she served as the flagship for Rear Admiral Masao Kanazawa, commander of the 8th Special Base Force during the initial occupation of the Shortland Islands and Bougainville in the Solomon Islands. Later that month, the ship supported the occupation of the Admiralty Islands.

During the Battle of the Coral Sea from 7–8 May 1942, Mutsuki was assigned to the Operation Mo invasion force for Port Moresby. After that operation was cancelled, Mutsuki remained based out of Rabaul, escorting shipping between Truk, Rabaul and Palau until recalled to Japan in July for a brief refit.

After repairs were completed at Sasebo Naval Arsenal on 12 July 1942, Mutsuki was reassigned to the IJN 8th Fleet and participated in the bombardment of Henderson Field on 24 August 1942. Mutsuki took a direct bomb hit in her engineering section, killing 41 crewmen and injuring 11 more. Yayoi took on the survivors, which included her captain, Lt. Cdr. Kenji Hatano.

Mutsuki was struck from the Navy List on 1 October 1942.

Notes

References

External links
Mutsuki-class destroyers on Materials of the Imperial Japanese Navy

Mutsuki-class destroyers
Ships built by Sasebo Naval Arsenal
1925 ships
Second Sino-Japanese War naval ships of Japan
World War II destroyers of Japan
Destroyers sunk by aircraft
Ships sunk by US aircraft
World War II shipwrecks in the Pacific Ocean
Battle of Wake Island
Maritime incidents in August 1942